The 1964 Cork Senior Football Championship was the 76th staging of the Cork Senior Football Championship since its establishment by the Cork County Board in 1887. The draw for the opening fixtures took place at the Cork Convention on 26 January 1964. The championship ran from 5 April to 15 November 1964.

University College Cork entered the championship as the defending champions.

On 15 November 1964, University College Cork won the championship following a 0-12 to 1-06 defeat of Carbery in the final. This was their sixth championship title overall and their second title in succession.

Team changes

To Championship

Promoted from the Cork Junior Football Championship
 Millstreet

Results

Quarter-finals

Semi-finals

Final

References

Cork Senior Football Championship